Àngel Fabregat Morera (born 1965, in Belianes) is a Catalan writer.

He studied at the Technical University of Madrid and at the Open University of Catalonia.

Prizes
 Premi Gabriel Ferrater 1988 de Poesia. Premis Literaris Baix Camp per a joves d'Òmnium Cultural.
 Premi de Poesia "Club d'Amics de la Unesco de Barcelona 1988".
 Premi Literari "Sant Jordi" (1989) Generalitat de Catalunya.
 Premi Ateneu Igualadí 1990.
 Premi e-poemes de La Vanguardia 2009.
 Premi de Poesia Miquel Bosch i Jover 2010.
 Premi de Poesia Josefina Oliveras 2010.
 Premi de Poesia Francesc Candel 2010.
 Premi de les Lletres Vila de Corbera 2010.

Works 
 Antologia d'un Onatge (Ed. Columna, 1990)
 Els vençuts.

Coauthor
 Sol de Violoncel (Ed. Reus : Òmnium Cultural Baix Camp, 1988)
 Paisatges amb Solitud (Ed. Reus : Òmnium Cultural Baix Camp, 1989)
 Els Mars Tancats (Ed. Reus : Òmnium Cultural Baix Camp, 1991)

References

External links
  "Goigs a la Mare de Déu de l'Incendi" de Rossend Perelló

1965 births
Living people
People from Lleida
Writers from Catalonia